Coiled-coil domain containing 60 is a protein that in humans is encoded by the CCDC60 gene that is most highly expressed in the trachea, salivary glands, bladder, cervix, and epididymis.

Gene 
The gene that encodes CCDC60 is located on the plus strand of chromosome 12 (12q24.23) and contains 14 exons.  The gene spans positions 119334712-119541047. The first record of the gene that encodes CCDC60 in the NCBI nucleotide database originated from a data set containing 15,000 human and mouse full-length cDNA sequences.

Protein 

CCDC60 is made up of 550 amino acids. The computational isoelectric point of CCDC60 is 9.17 and the computational molecular weight is approximately 63kDa. Western blots of RT-4 and U-251 cell lines support the predicted molecular weight. The predicted subcellular location of CCDC60 is the mitochondria. The secondary structure of CCDC60 contains a namesake coiled-coil domain in addition to predicted alpha helices and coils.

Regulation

Gene expression 
The expression of CCDC60 is tissue-specific. CCDC60 is most highly expressed in the trachea, salivary glands, bladder, cervix, and epididymis. CCDC60 is also expressed in epithelial cells of the upper respiratory system. RNA seq data shows relatively high levels of expression in the prostate, moderate expression in the lungs and ovaries, and low expression in the colon, adrenal gland, and brain.

Transcription factors 
There are many candidate transcription factors that bind to the promoter region of the gene that encodes CCDC60.

Post-translational modification 
CCDC60 is a candidate for phosphorylation by Protein kinase C. The initial methionine residue is predicted to be cleaved from the polypeptide after translation.

Evolutionary history

Orthologs 
The most distantly related organism in which a likely ortholog to Human CCDC60 can be found in is Amphimedon queenslandica, a sea sponge. Orthologs to Human CCDC60 are not found in any prokaryotes. Interestingly, there are no known orthologs in arthropods, although there are many other invertebrates that possess likely orthologs.

Paralogs 
There are no known paralogs of CCDC60.

Protein interactions 
There are several binary protein interactions involving CCDC60 that have been experimentally verified.

Clinical significance 
Mutations in CCDC60 have been associated with decreased walking speed. Additionally, CCDC60 is one of many candidate genes that has been associated with diagnosis of schizophrenia in genome-wide study.

References